Máiréad Tyers is an Irish actor. Tyers is best known for her work playing Jen on the Disney+ show Extraordinary.

Early life
Growing up in Ballinhassig in Cork, Ireland, Tyers had considered studying at UCC, but moved to London in 2017 following a successful audition for RADA. Tyers took part in a variety of stage and screen productions while studying at RADA, before graduating with a BA in Acting in 2020.

Tyers was working in a cinema prior to landing her role in Extraordinary.

Personal life 
Tyers speaks Irish and French. She plays camogie, ultimate frisbee, and football. She sings soprano and can play piano to an intermediate level.

Career
Whilst at RADA, Tyers had a successful table read with the academy's president, Kenneth Branagh, and subsequently appeared in his film Belfast. She appeared in the comedy play Changing the Sheets, at both Dublin Fringe Festival in 2021, and Edinburgh Fringe Festival in 2022. 

Tyers played a small role in ITVX teen drama Tell Me Everything, which premiered in December 2022.

In 2023, Tyers appeared as Jen, the lead in Disney+ show Extraordinary, a role for which she was cast and started filming in late 2021. Tyers said of the character "I love Jen, she's an eejit". Speaking of Tyers, Ed Power in The Irish Times called it a “breakout performance” of a “star in the making”. In an interview with Collider, Tyers noted that show creator Emma Moran's writing attracted her to the project:
The writing of it is just so brilliant and it feels quite unique in that I think it's the humor of it is quite current. It's quite our age group, very current, but somehow Emma has written it that I feel like it's going to be relatable for loads of different age groups, whether you've been through this period of your life or whether it's ahead for you. And I mean, the characters are so funny. The first scene that I read was the interview scene at the very start. And I was just like, this is absolutely hilarious. The idea that this girl has to, she can't help but be completely honest and everything just completely blurts out and it's kind of unapologetically honest, and not sugar-coated.

Tyers has upcoming appearances in the period dramedy series My Lady Jane, and action thriller Borderland.

Filmography

References

External links

Irish television actresses
Living people
Actors from County Cork
Date of birth unknown
Alumni of RADA
21st-century Irish actresses